Talavar may refer to:
 Talavar 1
 Talavar 2
 Talavar 3